Andrew Jack (born Andrew Duncan Hutchinson; 28 January 1944 – 31 March 2020) was a British dialect coach and actor from London who had worked on over 80 motion pictures since 1982.

Early life 
His father Stephen Jack was an actor in films, radio and television.

Career 
He had worked with over 200 actors including Robert Downey Jr. (in Richard Attenborough's Chaplin, Michael Hoffman's Restoration and Guy Ritchie's Sherlock Holmes), Pierce Brosnan (in GoldenEye, Tomorrow Never Dies and Die Another Day), Cate Blanchett, and Viggo Mortensen. As supervising dialect coach for The Lord of the Rings, he created the Middle-earth accents and taught them, along with Elvish and Black Speech, to the cast of the trilogy. He designed and taught the accents for the Greeks and Trojans in Wolfgang Petersen's Troy. He taught Evan Davis to speak with a Nottinghamshire twang. He was known for helping non-British actors to be more intelligible to the audience.

Jack can also be seen in the Star Wars film series portraying Resistance Major (later promoted to General) Caluan Ematt in Star Wars: The Force Awakens and Star Wars: The Last Jedi. He also voiced the character of Moloch in Solo: A Star Wars Story. The final film he was working on at the time of his death was The Batman, which was dedicated to him.

Personal life 
Jack was married to Felicity Filmore from 1974 to 1987, and to Paula Jack from 2000 to 2018; both marriages ended in divorce.

Jack's widow Gabrielle Rogers is also a voice, accent and dialect coach who first started working in the film, television and theatre industries as an actor in the 1980s. Rogers and Jack were married in 2019.

Death
Jack died on 31 March 2020 at the age of 76 from COVID-19.
His wife Gabrielle Rogers wrote on Twitter:

Filmography

References

External links 
 

1944 births
2020 deaths
British voice coaches
People from Finchley
Film people from London
20th-century British male actors
21st-century British male actors
Deaths from the COVID-19 pandemic in England